Kuruva, Malappuram, a village in Malappuram district, Kerala, India
 Kuruvadweep, an island in Wayanad district, Kerala, India
 Thottada, a coastal village in Kannur district, Kerala, India